"Decir Adiós" ("Say Goodbye) is a song written and co-produced by Kike Santander along with Emilio Estefan and performed by Puerto Rican entertainer Carlos Ponce. It was released as the second single from his 1998 self-titled debut album. The track became his second number one on both the Hot Latin Songs and Latin Pop Airplay charts in the United States. It was acknowledged as an award-winning song at the 2000 BMI Latin Awards. Its music video was filmed in Miami and directed by J.C Barros.

Charts

Weekly charts

Year-end charts

See also 
List of number-one Billboard Hot Latin Tracks of 1998
List of Billboard Latin Pop Airplay number ones of 1998

References

1998 singles
1998 songs
1990s ballads
Carlos Ponce songs
Pop ballads
Spanish-language songs
Song recordings produced by Emilio Estefan
Song recordings produced by Kike Santander
Songs written by Kike Santander
EMI Latin singles